Baljurashi or Biljurashi is a city in Al Bahah Region, south-western Saudi Arabia. It was the capital of the region which includes the tribes of Ghamid and Zahran. It is a medium-sized city in Al Bahah Region. The best time for a visit is from mid-August till the end of September. Most of the native people of Baljurashi live outside it; however, a great number of them spend their summer vacations in the city, which explains the massive increase in population number during summer.

The local people of Baljurshi have contributed to progress in Saudi Arabia as much as many other tribes. Some of the famous traders in Saudi Arabia are from Baljurashi. The people of Baljurashi are well-educated because Baljurashi was the enlightenment center in the south of Saudi Arabia and the center of the old trade route for hundreds of years. A large population from Baljurashi's locals have been known as academics in the universities and colleges throughout the kingdom. They are famous for their contribution to industrial and commercial firms in Saudi Arabia, especially the national oil firm ARAMCO, where many vice presidents are from Baljurashi.  The place is considered to be a tribal city dominated by the Ghamidi tribe, which is one of the large tribes in Saudi Arabia. Ghamid tribe has been known since before the time of the Islamic Nabī (Prophet) Muhammad, and many were muḥaddithūn (narrators or transmitters) to his sayings.

"A major summer resort located on Sarah Mountains and one of the most beautiful southern cities on the road linking Taif with Abha. Its nice forests like Raghadan makes you disbelieve that you are in Saudi Arabia. It is the land of one thousand and one watchtowers. Baljurashi is a sister town at the head of an ancient seasonal camel trail so steep that is named "camel steps". The camel steps of Baljourashi are a set of man-made steps that allowed camels to rise up this escarpment. They extend all of the way down to the bottom."

Hospital
Baljurashi Hospital is a Ministry of Health (MOH) owned and regulated public service hospital in the region of Al Baha. It is a 200-bed multispeciality hospital with an Intensive Care Unit (ICU), HDU, and well-equipped ER.

Wildlife

The nimr (leopard) was reported in Wadi Khatayn, south of Baljurashi, in 2002, and the species was confirmed by killings, several reports of sightings from different witnesses, livestock killed and the presences of tracks and signs. However, camera traps deployed there during 2002 and 2003 failed to obtain pictures of leopards.

See also

List of cities and towns in Saudi Arabia
'Asir Region
Asir Mountains
 Hejaz
 Hijaz mountains

References

Populated places in Al-Bahah Province